Marpesia orsilochus, the Orsilochus daggerwing, is a species of butterfly of the family Nymphalidae. It is found in Suriname and Brazil. The habitat consists of evergreen rainforests.

The dorsal upperside is dark brown with a bright white band across all wings. The hindwing has a long slender tail.

References

External links
 "Species Marpesia orsilochus". Butterflies of America. Retrieved February 20, 2019.
 "Orsilochus Daggerwing (Marpesia orsilochus)". Neotropical Butterflies. Retrieved February 20, 2019.

Cyrestinae
Butterflies described in 1776
Nymphalidae of South America
Fauna of Brazil
Taxa named by Johan Christian Fabricius